Lanien Blanchette (born 1986) is a politician from Saint Kitts and Nevis, who as of 2022 is serving as Speaker of National Assembly of Saint Kitts and Nevis.

She has bachelor's degree in criminal justice from Monroe College, New York. She graduated from bachelor of laws programme at the University of the West Indies, Cave Hill Campus in Barbados. She is lawyer by profession.

References

1986 births
Living people
Speakers of the National Assembly (Saint Kitts and Nevis)
Saint Kitts and Nevis Labour Party politicians
21st-century women politicians
Saint Kitts and Nevis women in politics
Women legislative speakers
University of the West Indies alumni